Massimo Busacca (born 6 February 1969) is a Swiss former football referee. He lives in Monte Carasso, Ticino, near Bellinzona.

Early life
Busacca was born in Bellinzona, Switzerland, to Italian parents from Sicily. Busacca used to play football in a lower division in Ticino. After a successful career as a top referee he became Head of FIFA Refereeing in July 2011.

Career
Busacca was a Swiss Super League Referee from 1996 to 2011 and a FIFA referee from 1999 to 2011.

Busacca took charge of the 2007 UEFA Cup Final at Hampden Park on 16 May, one of the biggest appointments for a UEFA referee. Busacca sent off RCD Espanyol midfielder Moisés Hurtado for a second bookable offence during the match.

Busacca was selected to referee at the UEFA Euro 2008 tournament in Austria and Switzerland.

At the tournament, Busacca was the referee for the Group C game between Netherlands and Romania, the Group D game between Greece and Sweden and the semi Final match between Germany and Turkey.

Busacca was selected to referee the UEFA Champions League Final in Rome on 27 May 2009 between FC Barcelona and Manchester United.

He was chosen as a referee for the 2009 FIFA Confederations Cup, refereeing the 2009 FIFA Confederations Cup semi-final game between South Africa and Brazil match on 25 June 2009 in Johannesburg and Brazil went on to win 1–0.

On 19 September 2009, Busacca was the referee in a Swiss Cup match between FC Baden and BSC Young Boys. After crowd trouble disrupted the game after home side Baden took an unlikely lead, Busacca raised his middle finger to the crowd. Busacca had initially denied making the obscene gesture but was handed a three-match ban by the Swiss Football Association and was forced to issue an apology.

2006 FIFA World Cup 

Busacca was chosen to be a referee at the 2006 FIFA World Cup in Germany.

He refereed three games:

 14 June 2006 (group stage): Spain vs. Ukraine 4–0
 20 June 2006 (group stage): Sweden vs. England 2–2
 24 June 2006 (round of 16) : Argentina vs. Mexico 2–1. ET.

2010 FIFA World Cup
He was selected as a referee for the 2010 FIFA World Cup and refereed the South Africa vs. Uruguay game.

He awarded a penalty and showed the red card to the South African goalkeeper, Itumeleng Khune, in the 77th minute, for tripping the Uruguay striker, Luis Suárez. Hosts South Africa went on to lose the game 3–0, and Khune became just the second goalkeeper to be sent off in World Cup history.

2011 Champions League
On 8 March 2011, Busacca was the referee in a UEFA Champions League 2010–11 Round of 16 match between Arsenal F.C. and FC Barcelona controversially sending Robin Van Persie off for kicking the ball after the whistle, with some commentators suggesting that he had cemented his place in the hall of fame of worst refereeing decisions of all time

Notable achievements 
FIFA World Cup in Germany 2006 and South Africa 2010.
Euro 2008 in Switzerland and Austria.
UEFA Champions League Final 2009: FC Barcelona – Manchester United.
UEFA Cup Final 2007: Sevilla – Espanyol Barcelona.
IFFHS World's Best Referee: 2009
UEFA Super Cup Final 2010: Inter Milan – Atlético Madrid.
42 UEFA Champions League games, 45 UEFA Cup games.
245 games in the Swiss Super League.

Retirement and subsequent ventures
It was announced on 14 July 2011 that Busacca had taken up the position of Head of Refereeing Development with FIFA, retiring from active refereeing duties in the process.

Personal life
Busacca is a devout Catholic and was crowned Switzerland's non-smoker of the year in 2006.

References

External links
Rate Massimo in the Euro 2008 Finals
 Weltfussball Profile 
 FIFA Profile

1969 births
Living people
Swiss football referees
Swiss people of Italian descent
UEFA Champions League referees
FIFA World Cup referees
2006 FIFA World Cup referees
2010 FIFA World Cup referees
People from Bellinzona
Swiss Roman Catholics
UEFA Euro 2008 referees